Singapore maintains diplomatic relations with 187 countries although it does not maintain a high commission or embassy in many of those countries.

Singapore supports the concept of Southeast Asian regionalism and plays an active role in the Association of Southeast Asian Nations (ASEAN), of which it is a founding member.

Being a key member of ASEAN and a global hub, Singapore maintains good relations with many countries in the global arena, and embodies building friendships and mutual benefits in its foreign policy. The nation works closely with neighboring and regional countries, specifically in Asia-Pacific, and consistently supports international initiatives to maintain peace, security and order. It is one of the most pro-neutral countries in the world. Due to its status, Singapore is the headquarters of the Asia-Pacific Economic Cooperation (APEC) Secretariat, the Pacific Economic Cooperation Council (PECC) Secretariat, and is the host city of many international conferences and events. Singapore is also a member of the United Nations, World Trade Organization, East Asia Summit, Non-Aligned Movement, and the Commonwealth of Nations.

Due to obvious geographical reasons, relations with Malaysia and Indonesia are most important. Historical baggage, including the traumatic separation from Malaysia, and Konfrontasi with Indonesia, have caused a siege mentality of sorts. Singapore enjoys good relations with the United Kingdom which shares ties in the Five Power Defence Arrangements (FPDA) along with Malaysia, Australia and New Zealand. Good relations are also maintained with China and the United States. Additionally, it is one of the few countries to establish relations with both North Korea and United States simultaneously.

As part of its role in the United Nations, Singapore held a rotational seat on the UN Security Council from 2001 to 2002. It participated in UN peacekeeping/observer missions in Kuwait, Angola, Kenya, Cambodia and Timor Leste.

Timeline of Singapore foreign relations

 7 August 1965 – Singapore and Malaysia sign the separation agreement.
  9 August 1965 – The Malaysian Parliament votes to expel Singapore from the Federation; Singapore becomes an independent republic after separating from Malaysia.
 9 August 1965 – Ministry of Foreign Affairs was established and S. Rajaratnam becomes Singapore's first Minister for Foreign Affairs.
 21 September 1965 – Singapore is admitted into the United Nations as the 117th member.
 15 October 1965 – Singapore becomes the 22nd member of the Commonwealth.
 8 August 1967 – Singapore becomes a founding member of Association of Southeast Asian Nations (ASEAN).
 17 January 1968 – Britain announces its intention to withdraw its armed forces from Singapore.
 September 1970 – Singapore is admitted into the Non-Aligned Movement.
 14–22 January 1971 – Singapore hosts the 18th Conference of the Commonwealth Heads of Government Meeting.
 15–16 April 1971 – Singapore, United Kingdom, Malaysia, Australia and New Zealand sign the Five Power Defence Arrangements.
 31 October 1971 – The last British military forces withdraws from Singapore.
 1973 – Singapore joins General Agreement on Tariffs and Trade (GATT).
 March 1981 – Singapore's Permanent Representative to the United Nations, Ambassador Tommy Koh, assumed the presidency of the Third UN Conference on the Law of the Sea.
 3 October 1990 – Singapore and People's Republic of China establish diplomatic relations.
 11 February 1993 – Asia Pacific Economic Cooperation Secretariat set up in Singapore.
 26 February 1994 – Singapore and China signed an agreement to jointly develop the Suzhou Industrial Park.
 5 May 1994 – United States media sensationalise the caning incident of American teenager Michael P. Fay who was convicted for vandalism.
 1 January 1995 – Inauguration of World Trade Organization (WTO), Ambassador K Kesavapany is elected for a one-year term as chairman of the General Council.
 9–13 December 1996 – Singapore hosts the 1st WTO Ministerial Conference.
 15 January 1998 – Singapore and United States announces agreement for US ships to use a planned $35 million naval base from 2000.
 10 October 2000 – Singapore is elected as a non-permanent member of the United Nations Security Council (UNSC) at the 55th session of the UN General Assembly.
 14 November 2000 – Singapore and New Zealand sign Agreement on Closer Economic Partnership, Singapore's first bilateral Free Trade Agreement.
 1 January 2001 – Singapore starts its two-year term in the United Nations Security Council.
 15 January 2001 – A pipeline feeding gas to Singapore from Indonesia's Natuna field in South China Sea opens.
 13 January 2002 – Singapore and Japan sign the Japan-Singapore Economic Agreement.
 6 May 2003 – Singapore and United States sign the United States-Singapore Free Trade Agreement (USS-FTA).
 26 April 2005 – Singapore and Malaysia sign a settlement agreement concerning land reclamation in and around the Straits of Johor.
 15–17 August 2005 – Singapore hosted a multi-national maritime interdiction exercise, codename Exercise Deep Sabre, participated by 13 countries.
 23 August 2005 – Singapore and Australia sign a memorandum of agreement to allow Singapore Armed Forces to train on the Shoalwater Bay Training Area till 2009.
 14 December 2005 – Singapore attends the inaugural East Asia Summit (EAS).
 18 November 2007 – Singapore signed an agreement with China to jointly develop Tianjin Eco-city.
 23 May 2008 – territorial dispute of Pedra Branca with Malaysia is largely settled through adjudication by International Court of Justice with Singapore getting Pedra Branca and Malaysia awarded Middle Rocks.
 20 September 2010 – railway land owned by Malaysia through KTM is returned to Singapore in exchange for joint development of plots of land at prime locations, ending the 20-year impasse of the Points of Agreement.
 23 November 2016 – 9 Terrex infantry carrier vehicles were detained in Kwai Chung Container Terminal at Hong Kong while en route from Taiwan. The vehicles were detained for more than two months despite diplomatic efforts by Singapore to retrieve its assets, signalling deteriorating of ties with China.

Foreign policy

Singapore's leaders are realists; they perceive a Hobbesian world where might makes right. The resultant siege mentality is due to Singapore's geographical weaknesses, mistrust of Malaysia and Indonesia due to historical baggage, and from how it stands out as a "little red dot in a sea of green", as then-President Habibie of Indonesia put it.

Singapore's first foreign minister was S. Rajaratnam, and the country's foreign policy still bears his imprimatur. Rajaratnam originally framed Singapore's foreign policy, taking into account "the jungle of international politics", and was wary of foreign policy "on the basis of permanent enemies." In 1966, S. Rajaratnam saw Singapore's challenge as ensuring its sustained survival, peace, and prosperity in a region suffering from mutual jealousies, internal violence, economic disintegration and great power conflicts.

In accordance with this worldview, Singapore's foreign policy is aimed at maintaining friendly relations with all countries, especially Malaysia, Indonesia, and ASEAN, and ensuring that its actions do not exacerbate its neighbours' insecurities. In 1972, Rajaratnam envisioned the world being Singapore's hinterland – integration into the world economy would ameliorate Singapore's inherent lack of natural resources.

Thus, Rajaratnam believed that maintaining a balance of power, rather than becoming a de facto vassal of some larger power, would provide Singapore with freedom to pursue an independent foreign policy. The cultivation of the great powers' interest in Singapore also would effectively function to deter the interference of regional powers.

Trade agreements

International organizations

APEC

The Asia-Pacific Economic Cooperation (APEC) is based in Singapore, of which Singapore is a founding member of. Singapore has long recognised the importance of APEC as an essential platform for promoting economic linkages and its benefits towards strengthening regional peace and security between member economies. Singapore has endorsed APEC's efforts at regional economic integration as well as its non-trade agendas of human resource development, emergency preparedness and health. Singapore has since hosted the APEC forum in 2009.

INTERPOL

The International Criminal Police Organization INTERPOL has opened its Global Complex for Innovation, or IGCI, in Singapore in 2015. As of 2016, the IGCI houses a global Command and Coordination Centre, the Organization's Capacity Building and Training Directorate, an Innovation Centre annex Cyber Research Lab, and the Cybercrime Directorate, which also incorporates the building's iconic Cyber Fusion Centre. The building is also used for large-scale projects and operations with a global impact, law enforcement trainings and cross-sector conferences with a nexus in the ASEAN region.

G20

Singapore, although not a G20 member, has been invited to participate in G20 summits and its related processes in 2010, 2011 and from 2013 to 2017 as a representative of the Global Governance Group. In February 2017, Minister for Foreign Affairs Dr Vivian Balakrishnan attended the G20 Foreign Ministers Meeting in Bonn.

Diplomatic relations 
Countries with which Singapore maintains diplomatic relations with:

Bilateral relations

Africa

Americas

Asia

Europe

Oceania

International humanitarian effort

 In December 2004, during the disaster wrought by the massive tsunami that hit Indonesia, the Singapore Armed Forces dispatched three Endurance class landing platform dock ships – RSS Endurance, RSS Persistence and RSS Endeavour off the coast of Meulaboh, one of the worst hit areas where all road access was cut off. On board these ships were medical and engineering teams and volunteers with NGOs. The ships were also loaded with medical supplies and heavy equipment to help clear roads and debris. Six Chinook helicopters and two Super Puma helicopters were also dispatched to Aceh, two Chinook helicopters and two Super Puma helicopters to Phuket, Thailand. C130s were also dispatched to ferry relief supplies to tsunami-hit areas.
 In September 2005, Singapore responded to the relief effort of Hurricane Katrina in the United States, by sending four CH-47 Chinook helicopters and forty-five RSAF personnel.
 In the aftermath of the 2005 Bali bombings, the Singapore Armed Forces sent a medical team, composed of two doctors, two nurses, and two paramedics, to Bali to help treat victims of the blasts at the Sanglah Hospital.
 In October 2005, the Singapore Civil Defence Force dispatched a 44-member Disaster Assistance and Rescue Team to Pakistan to help in the relief and rescue operations following the 2005 Kashmir earthquake

Participation in the War on Terrorism
Singapore is affected by ongoing international affairs relating to terrorism as demonstrated by the Singapore embassies attack plot.

During 15–17 August 2005, Singapore hosted a multi-national maritime interdiction exercise, codename Exercise Deep Sabre as part of the Proliferation Security Initiative to address the proliferation of weapons of mass destruction. Launched at Changi Naval Base and conducted in the South China Sea, the exercise involves some 2,000 personnel from 13 countries.

Singapore hosted the Regional Special Forces Counter-Terrorism Conference from 21 to 25 November 2005.

On 6 May 2004, then Prime Minister Goh Chok Tong delivered a speech at the Council on Foreign Relations in Washington, D.C. titled "Beyond Madrid: Winning Against Terrorism", expressing Singapore's view on the controversial and often criticised (see Criticism of the War on terrorism) war on terrorism.

International effort on anti-piracy

In August 2005, Malaysia, Indonesia and Singapore agreed to conduct joint anti-piracy patrols in the Malacca Strait to increase security in one of the world's busiest sea lanes Thailand later also joined in this effort.

Indonesia, Malaysia and Singapore conduct trilateral, coordinated maritime surface patrols, known as the Malacca Strait Sea Patrols, and coordinated airborne surveillance under the 'Eyes in the Sky' arrangement. Other forms of cooperation between the littoral states include an agreement between Malaysia and Indonesia in 2007 to increase joint anti-piracy training in the Malacca Strait, the Surface Picture Surveillance System (SURPIC) launched by Singapore and Indonesia in May 2005, and the Malacca Strait Patrol Information System (MSP-IS) to share information about shipping in the Malacca Strait.

Consulates

In addition to embassies or High Commissions, Singapore maintains consulates or honorary consulates in Austria, Bangladesh, Canada, Chile, People's Republic of China, Czech Republic, Denmark, Germany, Greece, Hong Kong, Hungary, India, Indonesia, Ireland, Israel, Italy, Japan, Jordan, Kazakhstan, Lebanon, Malaysia, Mexico, Nigeria, Norway, Pakistan, Papua New Guinea, Peru, Portugal, Saudi Arabia, South Korea, Spain, Sri Lanka, Switzerland (Permanent Mission in Geneva), Turkey, United Arab Emirates, United States of America and Vietnam.

See also

 List of diplomatic missions in Singapore
 List of diplomatic missions of Singapore

References

External links

 Singapore Ministry of Foreign Affairs
 Water trade and Pedra Branca

 
Singapore and the Commonwealth of Nations